Shikoku Mountains is a mountain range that runs from east to west in the central part of the Shikoku in Japan. The length of the mountain range is about 250km. The highest peak in the mountain range is Mount Ishizuchi.

References 

Mountain ranges of Japan
Geography of the Shikoku region